United Nations Security Council Resolution 411, adopted unanimously on June 30, 1977, noted statements made by officials of the People's Republic of Mozambique and also expressed its concern regarding the situation created by the provocative, aggressive acts committed by the illegal minority regime in Rhodesia. The Council reaffirmed their earlier work regarding Rhodesia, including their resolutions imposing sanctions on that country and noted their appreciation with Mozambique's co-operation with that plan. The Resolution then condemns Rhodesia's aggressive acts, including military incursions, against Mozambique and noted the urgent and special economic need of Mozambique who arose from its implementation of resolution 253.

The Council appealed states to provide immediate assistance to Mozambique, requested that various agencies of the UN, including the UNDP, the Food Program, the World Bank and the IMF assist Mozambique. Finally, the Resolution requests the Secretary-General organize the effort to overcome the economic difficulties that had befallen Mozambique due to its applications of economic sanctions against Rhodesia.

See also
 List of United Nations Security Council Resolutions 401 to 500 (1976–1982)

References
Text of the Resolution at undocs.org

External links
 

 0411
 0411
 0411
Rhodesian Bush War
June 1977 events
Mozambique–Rhodesia relations